"Ikaw ang Aking Mahal" ("You Are My Love") is a song by VST & Company. Its lyrics were penned by songwriter Joey de Leon while the music was composed by Tito Sotto and bassist Spanky Rigor. Released on their debut album VST, the ballad has been recorded by many other Filipino artists. The B-side, the disco number "Awitin Mo at Isasayaw Ko" ("You Sing and I'll Dance") is also one of the group's biggest hits. It is the last track on the group's debut album VST.

Sotto said in an interview with Arnold Clavio that the single became a monster hit to rival Boyfriends' "Dahil Mahal Kita" ("Because I Love You").

Cover versions
Malaysian band Alleycats recorded a Bahasa Malay cover of the song entitled "Jika Kau Bercinta Lagi" in 1978.
Reggae band Brownman Revival recorded a reggae version of the song in 2005.
Daniel Padilla recorded his version on the 2015 album I Feel Good.
Aiza Seguerra
Noel Cabangon

References

1978 songs
1978 singles
VST & Co. songs
1970s ballads
Tagalog-language songs